The Bridge of Cava da Velha is a Roman bridge, situated in the civil parish of Castro Laboreiro e Lamas de Mouro, in the municipality of Melgaço in northern Portuguese district of Viana do Castelo.

History

The name Ponte Nova indicates the existence of another structure constructed in the same local (or nearby) at one time anteceding the current bridge. This may actually be the nearby Ponte de São Brás or Ponta da Assureira. 

The bridge linked the Roman road to Espanha through Portela do Homem, passing through Estrimo (in Spain), Ameixoeira, Porto do Vaga and Assureira - Cova da Velha - Varziela - Castro Laboreiro. The bridge was largely constructed in the 1st century, but does not appear in the two most comprehensive lists of Roman bridges.

During the Middle Ages, the bridge was reconstructed to take on its current form. 

On 11 May 1758, there was a reference to the bridge, alongside the bridge of São Brás (or Assureira) by the priest Inácio Ribeiro Marques in the parish Memórias Paroquiais.

Architecture
The ramp arches are supported on the granite margins.

The structure, in irregular stone, has supported by worked ashlar with joints filled by smaller stones horizontally. Between the arches are prismatic starling upstream, and rectangular buttresses downstream. On the bottom of the arches are holes to fit the frame. The pavement is formed by large irregular slabs, protected by stone slab guards.

See also 
 List of Roman bridges
 List of bridges in Portugal

References

Notes

Sources
 
 
 
 
 
 
 
 
 

Nova
Bridges in Viana do Castelo District
Buildings and structures in Melgaço, Portugal
National monuments in Viana do Castelo District
Castro Laboreiro
Listed bridges in Portugal